The Syracuse Open was a golf tournament on the LPGA Tour, played only in 1956. It was played at the Drumlins Country Club in Syracuse, New York. Joyce Ziske won the event.

References

Former LPGA Tour events
Golf in Syracuse, New York
1956 in New York (state)
History of women in New York (state)
Events in Syracuse, New York